is a passenger railway station in the city of Shibukawa, Gunma, Japan, operated by the East Japan Railway Company (JR East).

Lines

Station layout
The station has a single side platform and a single island platform connected to the station building by a footbridge; however, only one side of the island platform is in use. The station is staffed.

Platforms

History
Yagihara Station opened on 1 July 1921. Upon the privatization of the Japanese National Railways (JNR) on 1 April 1987, it came under the control of JR East.

Passenger statistics
In fiscal 2019, the station was used by an average of 1080 passengers daily (boarding passengers only).

Surrounding area
 Furumaki Elementary School 
Furumaki Junior High School
Shibukawa Yagihara Post Office

See also
 List of railway stations in Japan

References

External links

 Station information (JR East) 

Railway stations in Gunma Prefecture
Railway stations in Japan opened in 1921
Stations of East Japan Railway Company
Jōetsu Line
Shibukawa, Gunma